The 2010 Houston Dynamo season was the fifth season of the team's existence since joining Major League Soccer (MLS) prior to the 2006 season. It was the team's fifth season with head coach Dominic Kinnear, majority owner Philip Anschultz, and chief operating officer Chris Canetti. On June 10, team president Oliver Luck left the Dynamo to become athletic director for his alma mater, West Virginia University.

This Dynamo failed to qualify for the MLS Cup Playoffs for the first time in franchise history during the 2010 season, finishing 7th in the Western Conference, 1 place and 13 points below the final playoff spot. In the U.S. Open Cup, Houston reached the quarterfinals, where they lost 3–1 to Chivas USA.  The Dynamo finished top of their group in the North American SuperLiga, before losing 1–0 to Monarcas Morelia in the semifinals.

On July 28, the Dynamo hosted the 2010 MLS All-Star Game at Reliant Stadium, where the MLS All-Stars lost 5–2 to Manchester United.

Final roster
As of October 24, 2010.

Appearances and goals are totals for MLS regular season only.

Player movement

In
Per Major League Soccer and club policies terms of the deals do not get disclosed.

Out
Per Major League Soccer and club policies terms of the deals do not get disclosed.

MLS SuperDraft

Coaching staff
As of October 24, 2010.

Pre-season and friendlies

Pro Soccer Classic

Friendlies

Competitions

Major League Soccer

Standings

Western Conference

Overall

Results summary

Results by round

Match results

U.S. Open Cup

SuperLiga

Player statistics

Appearances, goals, and assists 
{| class="wikitable sortable" style="text-align:center;"
|+
! rowspan="2" |
! rowspan="2" |
! rowspan="2" |
! rowspan="2" |
! colspan="3" |
! colspan="3" |
! colspan="3" |
! colspan="3" |
|-
!!!!!!!!!!!!!!!!!!!!!!!
|-
|1||GK||||align=left|||11||0||0||5||0||0||2||0||0||4||0||0
|-
|2||DF||||align=left|||28||1||2||23||1||2||2||0||0||3||0||0
|-
|4||DF||||align=left|||17||0||0||12||0||0||2||0||0||3||0||0
|-
|5||MF||||align=left|||30||2||2||25||2||2||2||0||0||3||0||0
|-
|7||FW||||align=left|||0||0||0||0||0||0||0||0||0||0||0||0
|-
|7||FW||||align=left||||10||1||3||9||1||3||1||0||0||0||0||0
|-
|8||MF||||align=left|||28||0||3||23||0||3||2||0||0||3||0||0
|-
|9||MF||||align=left|||25||3||3||22||3||3||0||0||0||3||0||0
|-
|11||MF||||align=left|||30||5||12||27||5||12||0||0||0||3||0||0
|-
|13||MF||||align=left|||3||0||0||1||0||0||2||0||0||0||0||0
|-
|15||FW||||align=left|||19||3||2||14||3||1||2||0||0||3||0||1
|-
|16||DF||||align=left|||6||0||0||4||0||0||2||0||0||0||0||0
|-
|17||MF||||align=left|||31||1||4||25||1||4||2||0||0||4||0||0
|-
|18||GK||||align=left|||23||0||0||23||0||0||0||0||0||0||0||0
|-
|20||MF||||align=left|||17||3||0||16||3||0||0||0||0||1||0||0
|-
|22||MF||||align=left|||32||4||1||26||2||1||2||1||0||4||1||0
|-
|23||FW||||align=left|||32||7||5||27||5||4||2||1||1||3||1||0
|-
|25||FW||||align=left|||23||7||3||20||7||3||0||0||0||3||0||0
|-
|26||MF||||align=left|||31||0||4||27||0||3||0||0||0||4||0||0
|-
|27||MF||||align=left|||4||1||0||2||1||0||2||0||0||0||0||0
|-
|30||GK||||align=left|||2||0||0||2||0||0||0||0||0||0||0||0
|-
|31||DF||||align=left|||32||2||1||28||2||1||0||0||0||4||0||0
|-
|32||DF||||align=left|||30||0||1||26||0||1||0||0||0||4||0||0
|-
|35||FW||||align=left|||16||3||1||12||1||0||1||0||1||3||2||0
|-
|35||MF||||align=left|||6||0||0||4||0||0||0||0||0||2||0||0
|-
|51||DF||||align=left|||18||2||1||13||2||1||2||0||0||3||0||0

Disciplinary record 
{| class="wikitable sortable" style="text-align:center;"
|+
!width=15 rowspan="2" |
!width=15 rowspan="2" |
!width=15 rowspan="2" |
!width=100 rowspan="2" |Player
! colspan="2" |Total
! colspan="2" |MLS
! colspan="2" |Open Cup
! colspan="2" |SuperLiga
|-
!style="width:30px;"|!!style="width:30px;"|!!style="width:30px;"|!!style="width:30px;"|!!style="width:30px;"|!!style="width:30px;"|!!style="width:30px;"|!!style="width:30px;"|
|-
|2||DF||||align=left|||5||0||3||0||1||0||1||0
|-
|4||DF||||align=left|||2||0||2||0||0||0||0||0
|-
|5||MF||||align=left|||7||1||3||1||1||0||3||0
|-
|7||FW||||align=left|||2||1||2||1||0||0||0||0
|-
|8||MF||||align=left|||1||0||1||0||0||0||0||0
|-
|9||MF||||align=left|||4||0||3||0||0||0||1||0
|-
|11||MF||||align=left|||4||0||4||0||0||0||0||0
|-
|15||FW||||align=left|||2||0||2||0||0||0||0||0
|-
|16||DF||||align=left|||1||0||0||0||1||0||0||0
|-
|17||MF||||align=left|||6||0||5||0||0||0||1||0
|-
|20||MF||||align=left|||3||1||3||1||0||0||0||0
|-
|22||MF||||align=left|||5||2||4||2||0||0||1||0
|-
|23||FW||||align=left|||2||0||0||0||0||0||2||0
|-
|25||FW||||align=left|||2||0||2||0||0||0||0||0
|-
|26||MF||||align=left|||1||0||0||0||0||0||1||0
|-
|31||DF||||align=left|||5||0||4||0||0||0||1||0
|-
|32||DF||||align=left|||5||1||5||1||0||0||0||0
|-
|33||FW||||align=left|||3||2||1||2||0||0||2||0
|-
|35||MF||||align=left|||1||0||1||0||0||0||0||0
|-
|51||DF||||align=left|||2||0||1||0||0||0||1||0

Clean sheets 
{| class="wikitable" style="text-align:center;"
|+
!Rank!!Nat.!!Player!!width=60|MLS!!width=60|Open Cup!!width=60|SuperLiga!!width=60|Total
|-
|1||||Pat Onstad||4||0||0
!4
|-
|2||||Tally Hall||1||1||1
!3
|-
|3||||Tyler Deric||1||0||0
!1
|-
! colspan="3" |Total!!6!!1!!1!!8

Honors and awards

MLS Player of the Week

MLS Goal of the Week

Annual

Dynamo team awards

Kits 
Supplier: Adidas / Sponsor: Amigo Energy

Notes

Houston Dynamo FC seasons
Houston Dynamo
Houston Dynamo
Houston Dynamo season